Silent Theory is a rock band from Moscow, Idaho, United States. It was founded in 2010 by brothers Mitch and Scott, George Swanger, Robert James, and Nick Osborn. Nick Osborn left the band in 2013, and in 2014 Dakota Jerns joined them as the lead vocalist.

Background
The band was signed to Turkey Vulture Records in 2010, where they recorded and released their debut album, Black Tie Affair, in 2011. Following the national tour after the album's release, Nick Osborn left the band to pursue other opportunities, and the rest left the label to go fully independent. In 2013, the band recruited singer Sean Walker from Seattle, Washington, and the band recorded their only single with Sean, "Outta My Head". Sean left the band to pursue other musical interests, which left the band at a standstill. In 2014, through mutual friends, the band was introduced to vocalist Dakota Jerns.

The band found recognition when the lead single song of Delusions, "Fragile Minds", charted both on radio and YouTube, becoming the band's first video to reach over 1,000,000 views. In 2021, the band signed with Paul Crosby Management, the founding member of the band Saliva.

Discography
Since 2014, the band has released three studio albums, Black Tie Affair (2011), Delusions (2016), and Hunt or Be Hunted (2021).

In 2018, Silent Theory recently released a music video for their single "Before the Storm", a song about addiction directed by Jon Kuritz. Then in 2021, they released a music video for their single "Shaking the Cages". "Shaking the Cages" was directed and produced by Dawson Scholz.

Recognition
Silent Theory's single "Fragile Minds" charted at 97 on the Mediabase Active-Rock radio and 29 on Under the Radar in 2016. "Watch Me Burn" charted at number 67 on Media Base Active-Rock radio in 2018, while "Shaking Cages" charted at number 22 on Billboard/BDS radio and 6 on Foundations in 2021. Their song "The Price" was at number 44 on Mediabase Active-Rock radio, 47 on Billboard/BDS, and 41 on BDS/Indicator, and another song, "Flicker", was at number 42 on BDS Indicator and number 29 on Foundations in 2021.

They also received the Band of the Year award from Krave Radio in 2016 and the Up-and-Coming Band of 2016 from 94.1 KMFL in 2017. Their song "Fragile Minds" ranked number 1 for Valley FM 89.5 Top Indie Tracks in 2016 and was also Lou Brutus MP3 Player Song Pick on HardDrive Radio in 2016. Rockin the Dark became the New Music Poll Winner on radio 94.1 KMFL in 2016. "Leave Alone", another song from the band, ranked number 1 on Best Metal Song of 2017 on radio Z 98.

References

External links
Official website – Silent Theory

Moscow, Idaho
Rock music groups from Idaho
Musical groups established in 2010